Magic or magick most commonly refers to:
 Magic (supernatural), beliefs and actions employed to influence supernatural beings and forces
 Ceremonial magic, rituals of magic
 Magical thinking, the belief that unrelated events are causally connected, particularly as a result of supernatural effects
 Magic (illusion), the art of appearing to perform supernatural feats

Magic or magick may also refer to:

Art and entertainment

Film and television 
 Magic (1917 film), a silent Hungarian drama
 Magic (1978 film), an American horror film
 Magic (soap opera), 2013 Indonesian soap opera
 Magic (TV channel), a British music television station

Literature 
 Magic in fiction, the genre of fiction that uses supernatural elements as a theme
 Magic (Chesterton play), 1913
 Magic (short story collection), 1996 short story collection by Isaac Asimov
 Magic (novel), 1976 novel by William Goldman
 The Magic Comic, a 1939–1941 British comic
 Magick (Book 4), 1913 book by Aleister Crowley
 Magyk, 2005 novel by Angie Sage
 The Magic (book), 2012 self-help book by Rhonda Byrne
 Magic (American magazine), 1991–2016 magazine for magicians
 Magic (music magazine), 1995–2016 French pop music magazine
 Magic, Inc., a 1940 science fantasy novella by Robert A. Heinlein

Music

Performers 
 Magic (rapper) (1975–2013), also known as Mr. Magic (real name Awood Johnson), American rapper
 Magic!, Canadian reggae-pop band
 The Magic Drum and Bugle Corps, a music group

Albums 
 Magic (Amii Stewart album), 1992 album by Amii Stewart
 Magic (Axel Rudi Pell album), 1997 album by Axel Rudi Pell
 Magic (B'z album), 2009 album by Japanese rock duo B'z
 Magic (Ben Rector album), 2018
 Magic (Bruce Springsteen album), 2007 album by Bruce Springsteen
 Magic (Djumbo album), 2008 album by Djumbo
 Magic (Exo-CBX album), 2018 by Japanese band Exo-CBX
 Magic (Four Tops album), 1985 album by the Four Tops
 Magic (Gillan album), 1982 album by British rock band Gillan
 Magic (The Jets album), 1987 album by The Jets
 Magic (Jolin Tsai album), 2003 album by Jolin Tsai
 Magic (Jorma Kaukonen album), 1985 album by Jorma Kaukonen
 Magic (Kiri Te Kanawa album), 2005 album by Kiri Te Kanawa
 Magic (Smash Mouth album), 2012 album by American rock band Smash Mouth
 Magic (T-Connection album), 1977 album by funk band T-Connection
 Magic (T-Square album), 1981 album by Japanese Jazz fusion band T-Square
 Magic (Tom Browne album), 1981 album by Tom Browne
 Magic (Twins album), 2004 CD released by the musical group Twins
 Magic, by Dreams Come True, 1993 album by Dreams Come True
 Magic, by Paul Mauriat, 1982 album by Paul Mauriat
 Magic (EP), a 2009 EP by The Sound of Arrows
 The Magic (album), 2016 album by Deerhoof
 Magick (album), 2004 album by John Zorn

Songs 
 "Magic" (B.o.B song), song by American hip hop recording artist B.o.B, from the 2010 album B.o.B Presents: The Adventures of Bobby Ray
 "Magic" (The Cars song), song by American rock band The Cars the 1984 album, Heartbeat City
 "Magic" (Coldplay song), song by British rock band Coldplay from the 2014 album, Ghost Stories
 "Magic" (Disco Montego song), song by dance duo Disco Montego from the 2002 album Disco Montego
 "Magic" (Dragon song), song by New Zealand-Australian rock band Dragon from the 1984 album Body and the Beat
 "Magic" (Kylie Minogue song), 2020 single by Australian singer Kylie Minogue, from the album Disco
 "Magic" (Ladyhawke song), song by New Zealand recording artist Ladyhawke from the 2008 album Ladyhawke
 "Magic" (Mystery Skulls song), song by American musician Luis Dubuc from the 2014 album Forever
 "Magic" (Nick Drake song), song by Nick Drake from the 2004 album Made to Love Magic
 "Magic" (O'G3NE song), 2014 single by Dutch group O'G3NE
 "Magic" (Olivia Newton-John song), 1980 song by Olivia Newton-John, from the soundtrack to the film Xanadu
 "Magic" (Pilot song), song by Scottish pop rock band Pilot from the 1974 album, From the Album of the Same Name, later covered by Selena Gomez
 "Magic" (Robin Thicke song), 2008 song by American R&B singer Robin Thicke
 "Magic" (Sean Smith song), 2017 single by Sean Smith
 "Magic" (The Sound of Arrows song), song by Swedish duo The Sound of Arrows from the 2011 album Voyage
 "Magic (What She Do)", 1985 single by New Zealand band DD Smash
 "Magick" (Klaxons song), song by London band Klaxons from the 2007 album Myths of the Near Future
 "Magic", by Axel Rudi Pell on the album Magic
 "Magic", by Ben Folds on the album The Unauthorized Biography of Reinhold Messner
 "Magic", by Bruce Springsteen on the album Magic
 "Magic", by Colbie Caillat on the album Coco
 "Magic", by Count Basie on the album April in Paris
 "Magic", by Future on the album Pluto
 "Magic", by Gabrielle Aplin on the album Dear Happy
 "Magic", by The Guess Who on the album Now and Not Then
 "Magic", by Jolin Tsai on the album Magic
 "Magic", by Justin Timberlake
 "Magic", by Michel Legrand on the album Magic
 "Magic", by Mick Smiley on the Ghostbusters soundtrack
 "Magic", by One Direction on the album Take Me Home
 "Magic", by Paul McCartney on the album Driving Rain
 "Magic", by The Pussycat Dolls on the album Doll Domination
 "Magic", by Rainbow on the album Difficult to Cure
 "Magic", by Rina Aiuchi
 "Magic", by Ryan Adams on the album Cardinology
 "Magic", by Sasha with Sam Mollison on the album The Qat Collection
 "Magic", by Secret on the album Secret Time
 "Magic", by Smash Mouth on the album Magic
 "Magic", by Status Quo on the album Ain't Complaining
 "Magic", by Stephanie Mills on the album Stephanie

Other uses in art and entertainment 
 Magik (comics), a fictional superhero appearing in publications by Marvel Comics
 Magic (game terminology), an attribute in role-playing and video games
 Magic (trade show), an annual apparel show
 Magic: The Gathering, a trading card game

Businesses and organizations

Sports teams
 Egoli Magic, a South African basketball team
 Orlando Magic, a National Basketball Association team
 Waikato Bay of Plenty Magic, a New Zealand netball team

Other organizations
 Multi-Agency Geographic Information for the Countryside, a UK mapping service
 Magic (company), a magic book publisher and product retailer
 Magic, Inc. (organization), an educational think tank
 Magix, subsidiary of the BELLEVUE Investments GmbH & Co. KGaA investment group

Radio stations 
Sorted alphabetically by call letters:

Canada 
 CIMJ-FM (Majic 106.1), Guelph, Canada
 CJMJ-FM (Magic 100.3), Ottawa, Ontario, Canada
 CJMK-FM (Magic 98.3), Saskatoon, Saskatchewan, Canada
 CJUK-FM (Magic 99.9), Thunder Bay, Ontario, Canada

United States 
 KKMG (98.9 Magic FM), Colorado Springs, Colorado
 KKMJ-FM (Majic 95.5), Austin, Texas
 KMAJ-FM (Majic 107.7), Carbondale, Kansas
 KMGA (99.5 Magic FM), Albuquerque, New Mexico
 KMGL (Magic 104.1), Oklahoma City, Oklahoma
 KNEV (Magic 95.5), Reno, Nevada
 KBOI-FM (Magic 93.1), Boise, Idaho, formerly KZMG
 KYMG (Magic 98.9), Anchorage, Alaska
 WAJI (Majic 95.1), Fort Wayne, Indiana
 WDYK (Magic 100.5), Cumberland, Maryland
 WJGH (Magic 107.3), Jacksonville, Florida
 WLMG (Magic 101.9), New Orleans, Louisiana
 WLTB (Magic 101.7), Binghamton, New York
 WLXN (Majic 99.9), Lexington, North Carolina
 WMAG (Magic 99.5), Greensboro, North Carolina, former branding
 WMGC-FM (Magic 105.1), Detroit, Michigan, former branding
 WMGF (Magic 107.7), Orlando, Florida
 WMGN (Magic 98.1), Madison, Wisconsin
 WMGQ (Magic 98.3), New Brunswick, New Jersey
 WMGS (Magic 93), Wilkes-Barre, Pennsylvania
 WMJI (Majic 105.7), Cleveland, Ohio
 WMJJ (Magic 96.5), Birmingham, Alabama
 WMJM (Magic 101.3), Louisville, Kentucky
 WMJX (Magic 106.7), Boston, Massachusetts
 WMXJ (Magic 102.7), Miami, Florida, formerly known as Majic 102.7
 WROW (Magic 590), Albany, New York
 WSPA-FM (Magic 98.9), Spartanburg, South Carolina
 WTHZ (Majic 94.1), Lexington, North Carolina, former branding

Elsewhere 
 Magic Nationwide, a radio network in the Philippines
 DWTM (Magic 89.9), Manila
 DYBN (Magic 92.3), Cebu
 DYBE-FM (Magic 106.3), Bacolod
 DXBE (Magic 89.1), Davao
 DXKB (Magic 89.3), Cagayan de Oro
 DXKM (Magic 106.3), General Santos
 Magic 1278 (3EE), Melbourne, Australia
 Magic Malta, Malta government's public broadcaster
 Magic (UK radio station), a radio station based in London and broadcast across the United Kingdom
 Magic (English former radio network), a former radio network in the United Kingdom
 Magic (New Zealand radio network), a radio network in New Zealand

Technology

Computing 
 Magic (programming), complex code behind a simple interface
 Magic (software), a layout tool
 ImageMagick, image manipulation software
 Magic Software Enterprises, a software company
 MagiC, an Atari ST operating system
 Gibson MaGIC, a network audio protocol
 Multi Autonomous Ground-robotic International Challenge, a robotics competition
 MAGIC, a programming language by Meditech

Other technology 
 HTC Magic, a mobile phone
 R.550 Magic, a missile
 Magnesium injection cycle, an engine design
 Magic (cryptography), a World War II cryptanalysis project
 MAGIC (telescope), Roque de los Muchachos Observatory, La Palma, Canary Islands
 MAJC, a microprocessor design

Transportation

Aviation 
 Airwave Magic, An Austrian paraglider design
 DTA Magic, a French ultralight trike wing
 Eurodisplay SR-01 Magic, a Czech ultralight aircraft
 Ibis GS-710 Magic, a Colombian aircraft design
 Ibis GS-700 Magic, a Colombian aircraft design
 Ibis GS-710 Magic, a Colombian aircraft design
 Ibis GS-730 Super Magic, a Colombian aircraft design
 Ibis GS-750 Grand Magic, a Colombian aircraft design
 Sunair Magic, a German ultralight trike design

Maritime 
 HMS Magic, several Royal Navy ships
 Carnival Magic, a cruise ship operating 2011–present
 Disney Magic, a cruise ship operating 1998–present
 Magic (log canoe), a Chesapeake Bay racing canoe

Other uses 
 Magic (horse), female miniature horse working as a therapy horse inside hospitals and hospice programs
 Magic (Middle-earth), magic as it appears in J. R. R. Tolkien's fictional realm of Eä
 Magic Johnson (born 1959), American basketball player and businessman

See also 

 Magica (disambiguation)
 Magical (disambiguation)
 Magician (disambiguation)
 Magik (disambiguation)
 Magique (disambiguation)
 It's Magic (disambiguation)
 
 

 Superstition (disambiguation)